Alessandro Lotta (born 26 March 1975) is the former bassist of the Italian symphonic metal band Rhapsody of Fire, which he joined in 1996. Before joining Rhapsody he played in smaller local bands in Trieste, Italy.

Between 1999 and 2000 he worked on cruise ships, as a bassist with the cruise ship's orchestra, mainly in Brazil, but also in Uruguay, Argentina, and briefly in Europe.

After Rhapsody, he joined a Finnish band called Wingdom, a progressive metal band.

Lotta was born in Trieste, Italy.

Instruments and gear
He plays different brands and boutique basses, 5–6 strings. Mostly seen live with an Samick Artist Series 6 strings bass, in the studio he uses 4–5–6 string basses, both industrial and handmade.

Discography

  - Symphony of Enchanted Lands
  - Dawn of Victory
  - Holy Thunderforce (EP)
  - Power of the Dragonflame
  - Rain of a Thousand Flames (EP)
  - Tales from the Emerald Sword Saga (compilation)
  - Reality with Wingdom
  - Dreamscape with Tragedian, guest musician on 2 songs

General trivia

He collaborated internationally as a guest musician, metal and otherwise, well known to hardcore fans of the band Rhapsody of Fire.
In 2009 he recorded an AOR / Classic rock album with other international rock and pop artists  such as:
- James Christian (Singer of House of Lords)
- Kee Marcello    ( guitarist of Europe And K2)
- Doogie White   (Former Rainbow and Yngwie Malmsteen vocalist)
- James Thompson (Saxophonist, known for his collaborations with Joe Cocker and big Italian blues artist "Sugar" Zucchero Fornaciari)

- On this album, Alessandro composed some original compositions, although a strong reminiscence of Rhapsody-times can be heard.  He plays the songs in a very unusual and technical way.

Lotta states on his website that he developed the basis of an unusual technique on bass, although there is no video evidence of this, just mp3-clips.  The technique appears to be somewhere between "slap" and "sweep-picking" (a very fast arpeggio style of guitar playing).
As of November 2008, he does not appear to affiliated with any particular band.

External links
 Official Rhapsody Of Fire website

1975 births
Living people
Musicians from Trieste
Heavy metal bass guitarists
Rhapsody of Fire members
21st-century bass guitarists